Grove Creek may refer to:
 Grove Creek Observatory, an astronomical observatory in Trunkey Creek, New South Wales, Australia
 217603 Grove Creek, an asteroid
 Round Grove Creek,  a stream in Jackson County, Missouri
 Grove Creek Natural Area (Virginia)